Richard Mark Elliott (born 20 March 1959) is a Welsh former professional footballer who played in the Football League as a midfielder.

References

1959 births
Living people
People from Rhondda
Welsh footballers
Association football midfielders
Brighton & Hove Albion F.C. players
Cardiff City F.C. players
AFC Bournemouth players
Ton Pentre F.C. players
Wimbledon F.C. players
Walton & Hersham F.C. players
English Football League players
Inter Cardiff F.C. players